FC KooTeePee was a Finnish football club.

History 
Originally FC KooTeePee was founded as a reserve team of Kotkan Työväen Palloilijat (founded 1927). In the year 2000, it became an independent club. At that time Kotkan Työväen Palloilijat was playing in Veikkausliiga, but was relegated to Ykkönen and finally went into bankruptcy. In the same season KooTeePee was promoted from Kolmonen to Kakkonen, and in two years it made its way to the highest level (coached first by Pasi Rautiainen and then Ismo Lius).
In their last season of 2013, the team played in Ykkönen and was coached by Sami Ristilä.

Supporters 
FC KooTeePee's supporters won the official "best supporters" award by the Finnish Veikkausliiga committee in 2004.

External links 
 Official website

References 

KooTeePee
KooTeePee
Kotka
2000 establishments in Finland